SFDR may refer to:

 Spurious-free dynamic range, a strength ratio for signals
 Solid Fuel Ducted Ramjet, a missile technology
 Sustainable Finance Disclosure Regulation, a sustainability regulation from the European Union; see also

See also
 San Felipe-Del Rio Consolidated Independent School District  (SFDR-CISD), Del Rio, Texas